Okmulgee County is a county in the U.S. state of Oklahoma. As of the 2010 census, the population was 40,069. The county seat is Okmulgee. Located within the Muscogee Nation Reservation, the county was created at statehood in 1907. The name Okmulgee is derived from the Hitichita (Lower Creek) word okimulgi, meaning "boiling waters".

Okmulgee County is included in the Tulsa, OK Metropolitan Statistical Area.

History
The Creek Nation was removed into this part of Indian Territory along the Trail of Tears after signing treaties exchanging their land in Georgia and Alabama in 1826 and 1832. The actual move occurred over the period from 1827 to 1836. The Creek Nation government, led by chief Samuel Checote, revised its constitution in 1867 and designated Okmulgee as its capital in 1868. The U.S. Post Office opened in Okmulgee on April 29, 1869. The Creek Nation built its capitol, a log building, in 1869. The building was rebuilt of stone in 1878.

Okmulgee County was formed on July 16, 1907, from Muskogee land, with a population of 14,362. County government offices were located in the Creek Council House until 1916, when the present Okmulgee County Courthouse was built. The former council building was then repurposed. The county's population was 21,115 in 1910 and increased to a high of 56,558 by 1930.

Railroads came to the area in 1900, when the St. Louis, Oklahoma and Southern Railway (later the St. Louis and San Francisco Railway or Frisco) built a line from Sapulpa, Oklahoma via Okmulgee to a place near the Red River. The Shawnee, Oklahoma and Missouri Coal and Railway (later also acquired by the Frisco) built a line from Muskogee  to Okmulgee in 1902–03.  It was abandoned in 1973. The Missouri, Oklahoma and Gulf Railway (purchased by the Kansas, Oklahoma and Gulf Railway in 1919) ran through Dewar, Oklahoma beginning in 1909, and the Okmulgee Northern Railway operated between Okmulgee and Deep Fork from 1916 to 1964.

In 1918, the boundary between Okmulgee County and McIntosh County was realigned, moving the towns of Grayson and Hoffman from McIntosh into Okmulgee County.

The Creek Council House still stands today.  While ownership of the building changed over the years, the City of Okmulgee in November 2010 sold the building back to the tribe for $3.2 million. The building currently houses the Creek Council House Museum, with artifacts and exhibits about the history of the Muscogee tribe and the arts and crafts of other Native American tribes.

Geography
Lake Henryetta, Okmulgee Lake, Nichols Lake, most of Dripping Springs Lake, and the tip of Oklahoma's largest lake, Lake Eufaula, lie within the county. The Deep Fork of the North Canadian River is the principal waterway in the county. The eastern part of the county is within the Eastern Lowlands physiographic region and the western part is in the Osage Plains.
Okmulgee Park and Dripping Springs Park lie west and southwest of the city of Okmulgee.   Deep Fork National Wildlife Refuge lies within the southern part of the county.  The area known as the High Spring Mountains is in the eastern part of the county south of Eram, and extending further south into McIntosh County in the Hitchita vicinity.

Adjacent counties
 Tulsa County (north)
 Wagoner County (northeast)
 Muskogee County (east)
 McIntosh County (southeast)
 Okfuskee County (southwest)
 Creek County (northwest)

Demographics

As of the census of 2000, there were 39,685 people, 15,300 households, and 10,694 families residing in the county.  The population density was 22/km2 (57/mi2).  There were 17,316 housing units at an average density of 10/km2 (25/mi2).  The racial makeup of the county was 69.73% White, 10.20% Black or African American, 12.85% Native American, 0.19% Asian, 0.02% Pacific Islander, 0.61% from other races, and 6.40% from two or more races.  1.95% of the population were Hispanic or Latino of any race.

There were 15,300 households, out of which 32.00% had children under the age of 18 living with them, 52.80% were married couples living together, 13.10% had a female householder with no husband present, and 30.10% were non-families. 27.10% of all households were made up of individuals, and 12.60% had someone living alone who was 65 years of age or older.  The average household size was 2.53 and the average family size was 3.06.

In the county, the population was spread out, with 26.90% under the age of 18, 9.50% from 18 to 24, 25.30% from 25 to 44, 23.30% from 45 to 64, and 15.10% who were 65 years of age or older.  The median age was 37 years. For every 100 females, there were 95.20 males.  For every 100 females age 18 and over, there were 90.80 males.

The median income for a household in the county was $27,652, and the median income for a family was $33,987. Males had a median income of $29,935 versus $20,861 for females. The per capita income for the county was $14,065.  About 14.90% of families and 18.90% of the population were below the poverty line, including 24.90% of those under age 18 and 15.50% of those age 65 or over.

Government
Okmulgee County government has three commissioners, one for each of the three Districts.   County services, including the District Court, Assessor, County Clerk, Jail, and Sheriff's office, are all located between 6th and 8th St, and Alabama and Seminole Avenues, in the City of Okmulgee.

Politics
Despite a sizable Democratic registration advantage, the county—like every Oklahoma county since 2000—has favored the Republican candidate for President in every election since 2000, the Republican margin of victory increasing with every election.

Communities

 Beggs
 Bryant
 Dewar
 Grayson
 Henryetta
 Hoffman
 Liberty
 Morris
 Okmulgee
 Preston
 Pumpkin Center
 Schulter
 Winchester
 Nuyaka

NRHP Sites

The following sites in Okmulgee County are listed on the National Register of Historic Places:

 Creek National Capitol, Okmulgee
 Eastside Baptist Church, Okmulgee
 First Baptist Central Church, Okmulgee
 Harmon Athletic Field, Okmulgee
 Hugh Henry House, Henryetta
 Isparhecher House and Grave, Beggs
 Lake Okmulgee Dam Spillway Cascade, Okmulgee
 Nuyaka Mission, Okmulgee
 Okmulgee Armory, Okmulgee
 Okmulgee Black Hospital, Okmulgee
 Okmulgee County Courthouse, Okmulgee
 Okmulgee Downtown Historic District
 Okmulgee Public Library, Okmulgee
 Okmulgee Stock Pavilion, Okmulgee
 Severs Block, Okmulgee
 St. Anthony's Catholic Church, Okmulgee
 Wilson School, Henryetta

References

 
1907 establishments in Oklahoma
Populated places established in 1907
Tulsa metropolitan area